Xiomara may refer to:

Xiomara (given name), female given name of Spanish origin 
Xiomara (genus), zoological genus in the family of Ichneumonidae

People with given name Xiomara
Xiomara Alfaro (1930–2018), Cuban soprano
Xiomara Blandino (born 1984), Miss Nicaragua 2007
Xiomara Castro (born 1959), also called Xiomara de Zelaya, Honduran politician, and wife of deposed President Manuel Zelaya
Xiomara De Oliver (born 1967), Canadian artist
Xiomara Griffith (born 1969), Venezuelan female judoka
Xiomara Laugart, Cuban singer, New York-based
Xiomara Reyes, principal dancer at American Ballet Theatre
Xiomara Rivero (born 1968), retired Cuban athlete who competed in the javelin throw
Xiomara Villanueva, a character on The CW series Jane the Virgin
, Colombian host of the children's program, Nubeluz
Xiomara Zelaya (born 1985), Honduran politician, daughter of presidents Manuel Zelaya and Xiomara Castro